Alexander Massialas (born April 20, 1994) is an American right-handed foil fencer.

Massialas is a two-time NCAA champion, 11-time team Pan American champion, two-time individual Pan American champion, and 2019 team world champion.

A three-time Olympian, Massialas is a 2016 individual Olympic silver medalist and two-time team Olympic bronze medalist.

Massialas competed in the 2012 London Olympic Games, the 2016 Rio de Janeiro Olympic Games, and the 2021 Tokyo Olympic Games.

Biography
Massialas was born in San Francisco, California, to a father of Greek descent and a Taiwanese mother. His father, Greg Massialas, fenced for the United States in the 1984 and 1988 Summer Olympics, and currently coaches the American national foil team. His sister, Sabrina, is also a high-level foil fencer. Despite this, Massialas was never pushed into fencing. After he showed spontaneous interest at an early age, his father made him wait until he was seven years old to begin training.

An athletic child, Massialas played soccer and made the basketball and the swimming teams at Drew School. He enrolled at Stanford University on a fencing scholarship in the fall of 2012. He closed his freshman season by winning the 2013 NCAA title in individual men's foil. He repeated this feat in 2015, after falling to David Willette in 2014's semifinal round.

Medal Record

Olympic Games

World Championship

Pan American Championship

Grand Prix

World Cup

See also
List of USFA Division I National Champions

References

External links

1994 births
Living people
American male foil fencers
Olympic silver medalists for the United States in fencing
Olympic bronze medalists for the United States in fencing
Fencers at the 2010 Summer Youth Olympics
Fencers at the 2012 Summer Olympics
Fencers at the 2016 Summer Olympics
Medalists at the 2016 Summer Olympics
Pan American Games medalists in fencing
Pan American Games gold medalists for the United States
Stanford Cardinal fencers
American sportspeople of Taiwanese descent
American people of Greek descent
Fencers from San Francisco
Fencers at the 2011 Pan American Games
Medalists at the 2011 Pan American Games
Fencers at the 2020 Summer Olympics
Medalists at the 2020 Summer Olympics
World Fencing Championships medalists